Novosergeyevka is a rural locality (a selo) and the administrative center of Novosergeyevsky Selsoviet of Arkharinsky District, Amur Oblast, Russia. The population was 83 as of 2019. There are 3 streets.

Geography 
Novosergeyevka is located 34 km southeast of Arkhara (the district's administrative centre) by road. Boguchan is the nearest rural locality.

Demography

References 

Rural localities in Arkharinsky District